The Association of Cricket Statisticians and Historians (ACS) was founded in England in 1973 for the purpose of researching and collating information about the history and statistics of cricket. Originally called the Association of Cricket Statisticians, the words "and Historians" were added in 1992 but it has continued to use the initialism ACS.

The ACS headquarters were formerly in Nottingham, opposite Trent Bridge Cricket Ground, but relocated to Cardiff in 2006.

Although constituted in England, the ACS has a worldwide membership and is open to anyone with a relevant interest.

Origin
Following the formal definition of first-class cricket by the then Imperial Cricket Conference (ICC) in May 1947, and particularly given ICC's statement that the definition does not have retrospective effect, a number of cricket statisticians became interested in developing an agreed list of matches played before 1947 from which to compile accurate first-class records.

Roy Webber published his Playfair Book of Cricket Records in 1951 and stated his view that first-class cricket records (i.e., for statistical purposes) should not include matches played before 1864. In this first edition, Webber accepted the records used by Wisden Cricketers' Almanack, including those that summarised the career of W G Grace.  In his second edition (1961), Webber challenged many existing views about match status and produced, inter alia, an alternative career record for Grace that did not include some of the matches Wisden recognises as first-class.

There was some support among cricket statisticians, including Bill Frindall, for Webber's basic arguments but there were (and remain) differences of opinion about his commencement date and about the details of his recommended matchlist.  The controversial cricket historian Rowland Bowen wrote a lengthy critique of Webber's sources in 1961. Bowen then started Cricket Quarterly (1963–70), devoted to cricket statistics, which included among its contributors some of the original ACS members.

The ACS itself was founded by Robert Brooke and Dennis Lambert, two of Bowen's contributors, by means of advertisements in the October 1972 issues of The Cricketer and Playfair Cricket Monthly.  These attracted a nucleus of some 50 members who formed the association in 1973.

Scope of activities
The ACS has sought to compile details of all known historically significant matches, and has widened its scope to include details of other competitions such as the Minor Counties Cricket Championship and the Second XI Championship in England. The bulk of its research concerns those matches that are officially or unofficially recognised as first-class or List A limited overs cricket. The findings have been published in-house in various guides (see list below) and in the Association's quarterly journal The Cricket Statistician. The Who's Who of first-class Cricketers is one of the few commercially published works.

Like Webber and Frindall, the ACS has no official position in terms of deciding the status of cricket matches. Any classification it publishes is merely its own opinion, as is the case with all other cricket writers. However, in 2006, the ICC asked the ACS to provide a comprehensive List A limited overs matchlist since the commencement of List A matches in 1963, and this has since been used as a basis for all official records.

ACS publications
The ACS publishes its findings in-house, typically in the form of paperback books. Many books are issued in series format. The publications include the following:  
 The Cricket Statistician (a quarterly journal for members)
 A Guide to Important Cricket Matches Played in the British Isles 1707–1863 (1985)
 A Guide to First-Class Cricket Matches Played in the British Isles (1982, 2nd edition)
 A Guide to First-Class Cricket Matches Played in Australia (1983, 2nd edition)
 A Guide to First-Class Cricket Matches Played in India (1986)
 A Guide to First-Class Cricket Matches Played in New Zealand (1981)
 A Guide to First-Class Cricket Matches Played in North and South America (1987)
 A Guide to First-Class Cricket Matches Played in Pakistan (1989)
 A Guide to Important Cricket Matches Played in South Africa (1981)
 A Guide to First-Class Cricket Matches Played in Sri Lanka (1987)
 A Guide to First-Class Cricket Matches Played in the West Indies (1984)
 Complete First-Class Match Lists, 1801–1914 (1996); 1914/15–1944/45 (1997); 1945–1962/63 (1997); 1963–1980/81 (1998); 1981–1998 (1999)
 The ACS International Cricket Yearbook (annual first issued in 1986)
 The ACS Second Eleven Annual (annual first issued in 1985)
 The ACS Famous Cricketers Series (complete playing records match by match of a cricketer – the series ended after 100 books in the series)
 The ACS Lives in Cricket Series (biographies of cricketers who had not previously had such a book published)
 The Minor Counties Championship (an ongoing series of the complete scorecards and statistics for each season, starting in 1895)
 Statistical Survey (a detailed statistical survey of each English season – books published covering seasons 1863 to 1881)
 Bangladesh First-Class Matches (scorecards of first-class matches in the country — books published covering seasons 2000/01 to 2006/07)
 Sri Lanka First-Class Matches (scorecards of first-class matches in the country — books published covering seasons 1989/90 to 2007)
 Zimbabwe First-Class Matches (scorecards of first-class matches in the country — books published covering seasons 1993/94 to 2006/07)
 ACS Overseas First-Class Annual (scorecards of first-class matches played outside England first issued for season 2008/09)
 Cricket Grounds (English first-class counties)

See also
 Variations in first-class cricket statistics

References

Bibliography
 ACS, various publications (see list above)
 The Cricketer, monthly magazine, 1961
 Bill Frindall, The Kaye Book of Cricket Records, Kaye & Ward, 1968
 Roy Webber, Playfair Book of Cricket Records, Playfair, 1951 and 1961 editions

External links
 The Association of Cricket Statisticians and Historians website
 Richard Streeton, 21 years of the ACS, ACS, 1994

Cricket historians and writers
Cricket records and statistics
Cricket statisticians
Organisations based in Cardiff
Organisations based in Nottingham
Sport in Cardiff
Sport in Nottingham
1973 establishments in England